"Sentado à Beira do Caminho" is a Brazilian song composed by Roberto Carlos and Erasmo Carlos and released as a single in May 1969 by Erasmo Carlos.

Background 
The song was inspired by  a 1968 hit song, Bobby Russell's "Honey (I miss you)", and it describes the despair and hopelessness of a lover waiting for his beloved. 
(the songs of Bobby Russell (Honey) and Erasmo Carlos / Roberto Carlos are two completely different songs. The hits "L'appuntamento", "Sentado à Beira do Caminho" and "Nuestro Encuentro" have the same music and similar lyrics in Italian, Portuguese and Spanish language. There is an important difference when translated from Portuguese to the Italian Language, the idea of "mixing tears with raindrops" was replaced with "wait for your love no matter the bad weather", which was an important loss of the initial message and a poetry theme switch).
A Spanish-language version of the song was also released titled "Sentado a la Vera del Camino" and was recorded by Erasmo Carlos. In 1988, American singer Eydie Gormé recorded the Spanish-language version (Sentado a la Vera del Camino) with Roberto Carlos for her album De Corazón a Corazón. The song peaked at number two on the Billboard Hot Latin Songs. Their version led to the duo receiving a nomination for Pop Group or Duo of the Year at the inaugural Lo Nuestro Awards in 1989.

In 1970 the song was adapted into the Italian language by Bruno Lauzi and recorded by Ornella Vanoni with the title "L'appuntamento". This version, chosen as the closing song of the radio show Gran Varietà, became an immediate hit, ranking #2 on the Italian hit parade. The song was also covered by several artists, including Mina, Andrea Bocelli, Johnny Dorelli, Fernanda Porto and (in a Greek version) Dimitra Galani (Δήμητρα Γαλάνη) (Συνάντηση - Encounter).

Vanoni's version was included in the musical score of the film Ocean's Twelve.

Track listing

Original version 
 7" single – RGE 70.363
 "Sentado à Beira do Caminho"  (Roberto Carlos, Erasmo Carlos)
 "Johnny Furacão" (Roberto Carlos, Erasmo Carlos)

L'appuntamento 
 7" single – CBS 3654 
 "L'appuntamento"  (Roberto Carlos, Erasmo Carlos, Bruno Lauzi)
 "Uomo, uomo" (Luciano Beretta, Donata Giachini, Nicola Aprile)

Sentado a la Vera del Camino 
 7" single – CBS  653054 7
 "Sentado a la Vera del Camino"  (Roberto Carlos, Erasmo Carlos)

Charts
 Ornella Vanoni version

Eydie Gormé and Roberto Carlos version

References

1969 singles
1969 songs
Roberto Carlos (singer) songs
1970 singles
1988 singles
Eydie Gormé songs
Portuguese-language songs
Ornella Vanoni songs

it:L'appuntamento (brano musicale)